Bowen therapy may refer to:

 Bowen technique, a remedial massage technique founded by Tom Bowen
 Bowen therapy, a psychoanalytic therapy devised by Murray Bowen